Domestic Relations is a 1922 American drama film directed by Chester Withey and written by Violet Clark. The film stars Katherine MacDonald, William P. Carleton, Frank Leigh, Barbara La Marr, Gordon Mullen, and George Fisher. The film was released on June 4, 1922, by Associated First National Pictures.

Cast      
Katherine MacDonald as Barbara Benton
William P. Carleton as Judge James Benton
Frank Leigh as Joe Martin
Barbara La Marr as Mrs. Martin
Gordon Mullen as Sandy
George Fisher as Pierre
Lloyd Whitlock as Dr. Chester Brooks

References

External links

1922 films
1920s English-language films
Silent American drama films
1922 drama films
First National Pictures films
Films directed by Chester Withey
American silent feature films
American black-and-white films
Preferred Pictures films
1920s American films